The 2014–15 Northern Illinois Huskies men's basketball team represented Northern Illinois University during the 2014–15 NCAA Division I men's basketball season. The Huskies, led by fourth year head coach Mark Montgomery, played their home games at the Convocation Center as members of the West Division of the Mid-American Conference. They finished the season 14–16, 8–10 in MAC play to finish in a tie for fourth place in the West Division. They lost in the first round of the MAC tournament to Akron.

Roster

Schedule

|-
!colspan=9 style="background:#000000; color:#cc1122;" |  Exhibition

|-
!colspan=9 style="background:#000000; color:#cc1122;" | Regular season

|-
!colspan=9 style="background:#000000; color:#cc1122;" | MAC tournament

References

Northern Illinois
Northern Illinois Huskies men's basketball seasons
Northern
Northern